Blue Blood or blue blood may refer to:

 Hemolymph, circulatory fluid colored blue by hemocyanin, a respiratory protein evident in most molluscs and some arthropods
 Nobility, a social class

Books
 Blue Blood, novel by Craig Unger, American journalist and writer
 Blue Blood, novel by  Edward Conlon (born 1965), New York police officer and author
 Blue Blood, a play by Georgia Douglas Johnson
 Blue Blood and Mutiny, a 2007 book about bank Morgan Stanley
 Blue Bloods (novel series), a series of vampire novels by Melissa de la Cruz, and the first book in the series

Film and TV 
 Blue Blood (1914 film), Italian silent drama film
 Blue Blood (1925 film), silent film
 Blue Blood (1951 film), American film
 Blue Blood (1973 film), British horror film directed by Andrew Sinclair
 Blue Blood (2006 film), a documentary film directed by Stevan Riley
 Blue Blood (2014 film), Brazilian film
 Blue Bloods (TV series), drama series on CBS

Music 
 Blue Blood (James Blood Ulmer album), 2001
 Blue Blood (X Japan album), 1989
 Blue Blood, an EP by Atrocity
 Blueblood (album), a 1998 album by Silkworm

Other
 Prince Blueblood, a character from My Little Pony
 The Blue Bloods, a wrestling "stable" from World Championship Wrestling in the 1990s and early 2000s

See also